The Tacna-Colmena Building, also known as the La Colmena Building is a building located on the periphery of the Historic Centre of Lima, Peru.

This 23-story building, topped by a private access penthouse with a pool, was built from 1959 to 1960 by Propiedades Horizontales S.A., a Peruvian construction company. At 84 meters high, it was the second tallest building in Lima after the 86-meter Javier Alzamora Valdez Building and was the first building with anti-seismic construction in Peru. The Tacna-Colmena building housed the Cine Colmena and the Banco Popular del Perú on the first floor. It was also the location an apartment owned by Mariano Prado, Manuel Prado 's son.

It currently works as a home for private homes and offices, and can be seen from various points in the district.

See also
List of tallest buildings in Peru

References

Buildings and structures in Lima
Buildings and structures completed in 1960
Brutalist architecture
1960 in Peru